Löbel, also spelled Loebel is a German surname.

Notable people with this surname include:
 Bettina Löbel (born 1962), German swimmer
 Bruni Löbel (1920-2006), German actress
 Hirshel Löbel, also known as Hirschel Levin (1721-1800), Polish rabbi
Nikolas Löbel (born 1986), German politician

See also
 Löbe
 Lobel (disambiguation)